Madison Township is one of twenty townships in Allen County, Indiana, United States. As of the 2010 census, its population was 1,771.

Geography

Unincorporated towns
 Boston Corner at 
 Hoagland at 
(This list is based on USGS data and may include former settlements.)

Adjacent townships
 Jefferson Township (north)
 Jackson Township (northeast)
 Monroe Township (east)
 Union Township, Adams County (southeast)
 Root Township, Adams County (south)
 Preble Township, Adams County (southwest)
 Marion Township (west)
 Adams Township (northwest)

Four Presidents Corners, a monument, was built in 1917 where Madison Township meets with Monroe, Jackson, and Jefferson townships. All four townships are named after presidents.

Cemeteries
The township contains Massilon Cemetery.

Airports and landing strips
 Valhalla Airport

Landmarks
 Bobilya Park

School districts
 East Allen County Schools

Political districts
 Indiana's 3rd congressional district
 State House District 79
 State Senate District 14

References

Citations

Sources
 United States Census Bureau 2008 TIGER/Line Shapefiles
 United States Board on Geographic Names (GNIS)
 IndianaMap

Townships in Allen County, Indiana
Fort Wayne, IN Metropolitan Statistical Area
Townships in Indiana